Electric Ladyland is the third and final studio album by the Jimi Hendrix Experience and the final studio album released before Hendrix's death in 1970.  A double album, it was the only record from the Experience produced by Hendrix. The band's most commercially successful release and its only number one album, it was released by Reprise Records in the United States on October 16, 1968, and by Track Records in the UK nine days later. By mid-November, it had reached number one on the U.S. charts, spending two weeks there. In the UK it peaked at number six, where it spent 12 weeks on the chart.

Electric Ladyland includes a cover of Bob Dylan's "All Along the Watchtower", which became the Experience's best-selling single, reaching number six in the UK and 20 in the United States. Although the album confounded critics in 1968, it has since been viewed as Hendrix's best work and one of the greatest rock records of all time. Electric Ladyland has been featured on many greatest-album lists, including Q's 2003 list of the 100 greatest albums and Rolling Stones 2020 list of the 500 greatest albums of all time, on which it was ranked 53rd.

Recording and production
The Experience began recording Electric Ladyland at several studios in the United States and UK between July 1967 and January 1968. Recording resumed on April 18, 1968, at the newly opened Record Plant Studios in New York City, with Chas Chandler as producer and engineers Eddie Kramer and Gary Kellgren.

Hendrix was famous for his studio perfectionism; he and drummer Mitch Mitchell recorded over 50 takes of "Gypsy Eyes" over three sessions. Hendrix was insecure about his voice and often recorded his vocals hidden behind studio screens. He sang backing vocals himself on the title track and on "Long Hot Summer Night". As recording progressed, Chandler became frustrated with Hendrix's perfectionism and his demands for repeated takes.

Hendrix allowed friends and guests to join them in the studio, which contributed to a chaotic and crowded environment in the control room and led Chandler to sever his professional relationship with Hendrix. Bassist Noel Redding recalled: "There were tons of people in the studio; you couldn't move. It was a party, not a session."

Redding, who had formed his own band in mid-1968, Fat Mattress, found it increasingly difficult to fulfill his commitments with the Experience, so Hendrix played many of the bass parts. The album's cover states that it was "produced and directed by Jimi Hendrix". The double LP was the only Experience album mixed entirely in stereo.

Hendrix experimented with other combinations of musicians, including Jefferson Airplane's Jack Casady and Traffic's Steve Winwood, who played bass and organ, respectively, on the 15-minute slow-blues jam "Voodoo Chile". 

While recording the album Hendrix appeared at an impromptu jam with B.B. King, Al Kooper, and Elvin Bishop.  In March 1968 he was joined onstage at the Scene Club in New York by Jim Morrison of the Doors.

Music
According to music journalist David Stubbs, Electric Ladyland is "undoubtedly a rock album, albeit rock on the point of evolving into something else." Uncut magazine's John Robinson said that its music reconciles the psychedelic pop of Hendrix's earlier recordings with the aggressive funk he would explore on his 1970 album Band of Gypsys. During its recording, Kramer experimented with innovative studio techniques such as backmasking, chorus effect, echo, and flanging, which AllMusic's Cub Koda said recontextualized Hendrix's psychedelic and funk sounds on the album.

Electric Ladyland is a cross-section of Hendrix's wide range of musical talent. It includes examples of several genres and styles of music: the psychedelic "Burning of the Midnight Lamp", a UK single the previous summer (1967), the extended blues jam "Voodoo Chile", the New Orleans-style R&B of Earl King's "Come On", the epic studio production of "1983... (A Merman I Should Turn to Be)", the social commentary of "House Burning Down", and the Sixties-era Britpop of Noel Redding's "Little Miss Strange". The album also features an electric reworking of the Bob Dylan classic "All Along the Watchtower", which has been well-received by critics as well as by Dylan himself, and also "Voodoo Child (Slight Return)", a staple of both radio and guitar repertoire. Rolling Stone Holly George-Warren praised "Crosstown Traffic" for its hard rock guitar riff.

"All Along the Watchtower" became the band's top-selling single and their only US top 40 hit, peaking at number 20; it reached number five in the UK. The album also included one of Hendrix's most prominent uses of a wah-wah pedal, on "Burning of the Midnight Lamp", which reached number 18 in the UK charts.

Cover

Hendrix had written to Reprise describing what he wanted for the cover art, but was mostly ignored. He expressly asked for a color photo by Linda McCartney (then known as Linda Eastman) of the group sitting with children on the sculpture of Alice in Wonderland in Central Park, and drew a picture of it for reference. The company instead used a blurred red and yellow photo of his head while performing at Saville Theatre, taken by Karl Ferris.

Track Records used its art department, which produced a cover image by photographer David Montgomery, who also shot the inside cover portrait of Hendrix, depicting nineteen nude women lounging in front of a black background. Hendrix expressed initial displeasure and surprise with this "naked lady" cover (but later told Rolling Stone magazine that he "dug it anyway"), much as he was displeased with the Axis: Bold as Love cover, which he found disrespectful. The cover was banned by several record dealers as "pornographic", while others sold it with the gatefold cover turned inside out, or in a brown wrapper.

In France and the Benelux countries, Hendrix's recordings were released by Barclay Records, and Electric Ladyland featured a front cover photograph by Alain Dister, and inner sleeve photographs by Jean-Pierre Leloir and Donald Silverstein.

Release and reception
Electric Ladyland was released in the US on October 16, 1968. It was a "hit psychedelic album", Richie Unterberger later wrote, and by mid-November, it had reached number one in the US, spending two weeks atop the pop charts. The double LP was the Experience's most commercially successful release and Hendrix's only number-one album. In the UK, it peaked at number six and charted for 12 weeks.

Electric Ladyland confounded contemporary critics; reviewers praised some of its songs but felt the album lacked structure and sounded too dense. Melody Maker called it "mixed-up and muddled", with the exception of "All Along the Watchtower", which the magazine called a masterpiece. Reviewing for Rolling Stone in 1968, Tony Glover said Hendrix's original songs sometimes sound unstructured and was somewhat disappointed by the "heavy handed guitar" on "1983... (A Merman I Should Turn to Be)" and the science-fiction conclusion to "House Burning Down". Ultimately, Glover appreciated the "energy flow" unifying the songs and described Hendrix as "amazing", adding that Electric Ladyland serves as "an extended look into Hendrix's head, and mostly it seems to have some pretty good things in it (who among us is totally free of mental garbage?)". Robert Christgau was more enthusiastic in Stereo Review, regarding it as an explosive showcase of rock's "most important recent innovation"—the "heavy" guitar aesthetic—and "an integrated work-in-itself in more ways than one". He found the production exceptional—"the best job of stereo for its own sake I know"—and was surprisingly impressed by the quality of the lyrics. While most guitarists in rock believed improvisation to be a straightforward endeavor, Christgau said "Hendrix achieves unique effects, effects you'll never get from Kenny Burrell", citing "Voodoo Chile" as an example. He later named Electric Ladyland the fifth-best album of 1968 in his ballot for Jazz & Pop magazine's critics poll.

Reappraisal 

Over time, Electric Ladylands critical standing improved significantly, with author and musicologist John Perry describing it as "one of the greatest double-albums in Rock." According to author Michael Heatley, "most critics agree" that the album was "the fullest realization of Jimi's far-reaching ambitions"; Guitar World editor Noe Goldwasser called it his greatest work. The record was also deemed an essential hard rock album in Tom Larson's 2004 book History of Rock and Roll, and Clash reviewer Robin Murray viewed it as a "true classic of the psychedelic rock era". In a retrospective review for Blender, Christgau wrote that it was the definitive work of psychedelic music, describing the record as "an aural utopia that accommodates both ingrained conflict and sweet, vague spiritual yearnings, held together by a master musician". In Charlotte Greig's opinion, much like Are You Experienced, Electric Ladyland was "groundbreaking, introducing audiences to a style of psychedelic rock rooted in the blues". The Washington Post critic Geoffrey Himes names it an exemplary release of the progressive soul development from 1968 to 1973. Author Amy Wallace called the album a "classic of acid rock."

Electric Ladyland has been featured on many greatest album lists, including a number 10 ranking on Classic Rock magazine's list of the 100 Greatest Rock Albums Ever, and number 37 on The Times 100 Best Albums of All Time. Music journalist and author Peter Doggett argued that it is very likely the greatest rock album of all time because of its exceptional concept, artful melodies, experimentation, and skilled musicianship, which he felt remains unparalleled by any other rock artist. The album was included in "A Basic Record Library" of 1950s and 1960s recordings, published in Christgau's Record Guide: Rock Albums of the Seventies (1981). In 2000, it was voted number 32 in Colin Larkin's All Time Top 1000 Albums. In 2003, Q magazine named Electric Ladyland as one of the 100 greatest albums,  while Rolling Stone ranked it 54th in its "500 Greatest Albums of All Time" publication. (Rolling Stones 2020 revision to the list upped the rank to 53.)

Track listing
The original US Reprise and UK Track albums did not list running times for the songs. Track lengths are taken from the 1968 International Polydor Production album. Some of the song titles differ slightly between the original US and UK album editions and between the titles shown on the album back cover, the inside liner notes, and the labels on the records themselves; the titles listed here are those shown on the record labels. All songs are written by Jimi Hendrix, except where noted.

Notes
As was common with multi-LP albums, sides A and D were pressed back to back on the same platter, likewise sides B and C. This was called auto-coupling or automatic sequence and was intended to make it easier to play through the entire album in sequence on automatic record-changers.

A new 50th anniversary edition was released on November 28, 2018. It features Hendrix's originally intended cover, and is available as a box-set with either a Blu-ray disc and 3-CDs or a Blu-ray disc and 6-LPs. The Blu-ray includes a 5.1 surround mix by Eddie Kramer and a high resolution version of the album remaster. The remastering was done by Bernie Grundman from the original master tapes. The box set also features early takes, demos and live concert from September 14, 1968, at the Hollywood Bowl plus a 1997 documentary "At Last...The Beginning: The Making of Electric Ladyland" featuring Chas Chandler, Mitch Mitchell, Noel Redding and Eddie Kramer.

Personnel
Credits taken from the 1993 MCA compact disc liner notes.

The Jimi Hendrix Experience
Jimi Hendrix – vocals, guitars, piano, percussion, electric harpsichord; bass guitar on "Have You Ever Been (To Electric Ladyland)", "Long Hot Summer Night", "Gypsy Eyes", "1983...", "House Burning Down", and "All Along the Watchtower"; comb and tissue paper on "Crosstown Traffic"
Noel Redding – backing vocals, bass guitar on "Crosstown Traffic", "Little Miss Strange", "Come On", "Burning of the Midnight Lamp", and "Voodoo Child (Slight Return)"; acoustic guitar and lead vocals on "Little Miss Strange"
Mitch Mitchell – backing vocals, drums, percussion all tracks except "Rainy Day, Dream Away" and "Still Raining, Still Dreaming"; lead vocals on "Little Miss Strange"

Additional musicians
Freddie Smith – tenor saxophone on "Rainy Day, Dream Away" and "Still Raining, Still Dreaming"
Steve Winwood – Hammond organ on "Voodoo Chile"
Mike Finnigan – organ on "Rainy Day, Dream Away" and "Still Raining, Still Dreaming"
Al Kooper – piano on "Long Hot Summer Night"
Dave Mason – twelve-string guitar, backing vocals on "Crosstown Traffic" and "All Along the Watchtower"
Jack Casady – bass guitar on "Voodoo Chile"
Buddy Miles – drums on "Rainy Day, Dream Away" and "Still Raining, Still Dreaming"
Larry Faucette – congas on "Rainy Day, Dream Away" and "Still Raining, Still Dreaming"
Chris Wood – flute on "1983... (A Merman I Should Turn to Be)"
Brian Jones – percussion on "All Along the Watchtower"
The Sweet Inspirations – backing vocals on "Burning of the Midnight Lamp"

Production
Jimi Hendrix – producer, mixing, arrangements, US LP issue liner notes
Eddie Kramer, Gary Kellgren – engineers, mixing 
David King – UK album sleeve design
David Montgomery – UK outer sleeve and inside photography
Karl Ferris – US cover design
Ed Thrasher – US art direction
Linda Eastman, David Sygall – US cover photography

Digital remastering
Lee Herschberg – initial compact disc release
Joe Gastwirt – 1989 compact disc release
Eddie Kramer, George Marino – 1997 compact disc release
Bernie Grundman, Scott Sedilo – 2018 anniversary compact disc release

Charts

Certifications

Notes

Citations

Sources

Further reading

External links
 
 Electric Ladyland (Barclay) at vinyl-records.nl

1968 albums
The Jimi Hendrix Experience albums
Track Records albums
Albums produced by Jimi Hendrix
Albums recorded at Olympic Sound Studios
Albums recorded at Record Plant (New York City)
Barclay (record label) albums
Polydor Records albums
Reprise Records albums
Grammy Hall of Fame Award recipients
Obscenity controversies in music